Nuwan Karunaratne (born 1 February 1994) is a Sri Lankan cricketer. He made his first-class debut for Ragama Cricket Club in the 2014–15 Premier Trophy on 16 January 2015. He made his List A debut for Ampara District in the 2016–17 Districts One Day Tournament on 25 March 2017.

References

External links
 

1994 births
Living people
Sri Lankan cricketers
Ampara District cricketers
Ragama Cricket Club cricketers
People from Anuradhapura